Dera Ghazi Khan Division is an administrative division of the Punjab Province, Pakistan. The reforms of 2000 abolished the third tier of government but division system was restored again in 2008.

Districts
It contains the following districts:

 Dera Ghazi Khan District
 Jampur District
 Kot Addu District
 Layyah District
 Muzaffargarh District
 Rajanpur District
 Taunsa District

History
During British rule, All the districts that later formed Dera Ghazi Khan Division, collectively formed a district of Multan Division. After independence, Dera Ghazi Khan was made into a division in its own right. It was abolished in 2000 but restored in 2008.

Demographics 
According to 2017 census, DG Khan Division had a population of 11,021,214, which includes 5,627,413 males and 5,392,956 females. 
DG Khan Division constitutes 10,994,261 Muslims, 17,738 Christians, 5,778 Ahmadi followed by 2,298 Hindus, 678 scheduled castes and 461 others.

See also
 Dera Ghazi Khan
 Louis Dane - In 1876 he was posted to the Punjab as assistant commissioner in Dera Ghazi Khan
 Mustafa Zaidi - served as assistant commissioner of Dera Ghazi Khan
 Andrew Jukes (missionary) - He was sent to Baloch mission at Dera Ghazi Khan, where he stayed until 1906
 Robert Groves Sandeman - in 1866 he was appointed district officer of Dera Ghazi Khan

References

Divisions of Pakistan